"This Time I've Hurt Her More Than She Loves Me" is a song written by Earl Thomas Conley and Mary Larkin and recorded by American country music artist Conway Twitty.  It was released in October 1975 as the first single from the album This Time I've Hurt Her More.  The song was Twitty's fifteenth number one country single as a solo artist.  The single stayed at number one for a single week and spent a total of ten weeks on the country chart.

Personnel
Conway Twitty — vocals
Carol Lee Cooper, L.E. White, Joe E. Lewis, The Nashville Sounds — vocals
Harold Bradley — 6-string electric bass guitar
Ray Edenton — acoustic guitar
Johnny Gimble — fiddle
John Hughey — steel guitar
Tommy Markham — drums
Grady Martin — electric guitar
Bob Moore — bass
Hargus "Pig" Robbins — piano

Cover versions
 Conley recorded his own version of the song on his 1980 album Fire and Smoke.
 In 1991, Neal McCoy took a cover version to #50 on the country charts.

Charts

Conway Twitty

Year-end charts

Neal McCoy

References
 

1975 singles
1991 singles
1975 songs
Conway Twitty songs
Earl Thomas Conley songs
Neal McCoy songs
Songs written by Earl Thomas Conley
Song recordings produced by Owen Bradley
MCA Records singles
Atlantic Records singles